Live at McCabe's may refer to:
Live at McCabe's (Byron Berline album), 1978
Live at McCabe's (Norman Blake album), 1976
Live at McCabe's Guitar Shop (Freedy Johnston album), 1998
Live at McCabe's (Shelby Lynne album), 2012
Live at McCabe's Guitar Shop (Tom Paxton album), 1991
Live at McCabe's (Henry Rollins album), 1990
Live at McCabe's Guitar Shop (Chris Smither album), 2003
Live at McCabe's (Townes Van Zandt album), 1995
Live at McCabe's Guitar Shop (Nancy Wilson album), 1999

See also
 McCabe's Guitar Shop